Javier Moreno Bazán (born 18 July 1984) is a Spanish professional cyclist, who currently rides for UCI Continental team .

Career
Moreno was born in Jaén. In 2009, Moreno won the third annual Criterium Ciudad de Jaén race, an unofficial two-day competition held during the off-season of the UCI World Tour circuit.

Moreno was named in the start list for the 2016 Giro d'Italia, but abandoned the race on Stage 7. After five years with Movistar, in September 2016 Moreno announced that he would join  for the 2017 season, with a role as a domestique for Vincenzo Nibali and with his main focus for the season being the Giro d'Italia. At the Giro d'Italia, he was disqualified on stage 4 of the race, after pushing Diego Rosa. In June 2017, he was named in the startlist for the Tour de France.

Major results

2005
 1st  Road race, National Under-23 Road Championships
2007
 1st Stage 4 Vuelta a la Comunidad de Madrid
 7th Clásica a los Puertos de Guadarrama
 8th GP Miguel Induráin
 8th Prueba Villafranca de Ordizia
 9th Overall Vuelta a Burgos
 10th Subida al Naranco
2008
 6th Clásica a los Puertos de Guadarrama
 9th Subida al Naranco
2009
 3rd Overall Vuelta a Asturias
2010
 5th Klasika Primavera
 6th Overall Vuelta a Castilla y León
2011
 1st  Overall Vuelta a Asturias
1st Stage 3
 2nd Overall Vuelta a la Comunidad de Madrid
 7th GP Miguel Induráin
 9th Klasika Primavera
2012
 1st  Overall Vuelta a Castilla y León
1st  Points classification
1st Combativity classification
 1st Stage 1 (TTT) Vuelta a España
 5th Overall Vuelta a Burgos
 8th Overall Tour Down Under
2013
 1st Vuelta a la Comunidad de Madrid
 2nd Overall Tour Down Under
1st  Mountains classification
 3rd Overall Vuelta a Asturias
1st Stage 2
2014
 1st Stage 1 (TTT) Vuelta a España
 2nd Overall Tour of Austria
 5th Overall Vuelta a Castilla y León
 10th Prueba Villafranca de Ordizia
2015
 1st Stage 1b (ITT) Vuelta a Andalucia
 6th Overall Vuelta a la Comunidad de Madrid
 7th Overall Vuelta a Castilla y León
 9th Overall Vuelta a Asturias
2016
 4th Prueba Villafranca de Ordizia
 5th Overall Volta a la Comunitat Valenciana
 6th Overall Circuit de la Sarthe
2017
 10th Overall Vuelta a Andalucía
2018
 1st  Overall Sharjah International Cycling Tour
 1st  Overall Vuelta a Aragón
 6th Overall Tour de l'Ain
1st Stage 2
 6th Overall Tour of Austria
2019
 6th Mont Ventoux Dénivelé Challenge
 9th Overall Tour de l'Ain
2021
 5th Clássica da Arrábida

Grand Tour general classification results timeline

References

External links

1984 births
Living people
Spanish male cyclists
Sportspeople from Jaén, Spain
Cyclists from Andalusia